The women's doubles was one of five events at the 1922 World Hard Court Championships. Germaine Golding and Suzanne Lenglen were the defending champions. Golding did not participate, but Lenglen partnered with Elizabeth Ryan to win her third title and second with Ryan, defeating Winifred Beamish and Kitty McKane 6–0, 6–4 in the final.

Draw

Draw

References

Women's Doubles